Iron Point is a side platformed Sacramento RT light rail station in Folsom, California, United States. The station was opened on October 15, 2005, and is operated by the Sacramento Regional Transit District. It is served by the Gold Line. The station is located near the intersection of Iron Point Road and Folsom Boulevard and serves the Folsom Premium Outlet shopping center.

Platforms and tracks

References

Sacramento Regional Transit light rail stations
Railway stations in the United States opened in 2005
Folsom, California